Helogenes gouldingi is a species of whale catfish endemic to Brazil where it is found in black-water tributaries of the Madeira River basin.  This species grows to a length of 4.7 cm (1.9 inches).

References 
 

Cetopsidae
Freshwater fish of Brazil
Endemic fauna of Brazil
Fish described in 1986